McEwan Pratt (full name: McEwan, Pratt & Co Ltd) was a manufacturer of narrow-gauge internal combustion locomotives, founded around 1905 in Wickford, Essex. It produced a wide variety of locomotives and railcars, but failed as a business and became a subsidiary of Baguley Cars Ltd in 1912.

History

Founding 
McEwan Pratt was founded in 1905, or shortly afterwards, as a private engineering company, by engineer Robert Henry McEwan, draughtsman Arthur Wellesley Pratt and Robert Davison - who provided financial backing. The company's headquarters was at Wick Lane in Wickford, Essex, and they maintained a London office at 13 South Place, London EC2.

Wickford 

In May 1907, they purchased the 6 acre former Darby Digger factory in Wickford. and started production of small locomotives. By December they were exporting vehicles to South Africa, and South America. 

McEwan Pratt was noted for its production of railcars, and by 1913 were supplying both finished cars and powered chassis to various government railways. In 1908, McEwan Pratt were producing the "Dando-Murray" paraffin locomotive, which was sold by London agents Duke & Ockenden. This arrangement was short-lived, though McEwan Pratt continued to use the "Murray" name for their products.

Financial struggles 

The company produced a wide range of locomotives but struggled financially. In 1909, they were forced to mortgage their works at Wickford. Matters deteriorated in the next few years, and the company went into liquidation in March 1912.

McEwan Pratt (1912) 

McEwan Pratt Ltd were wound up in March 1912, Baguley Cars Ltd approached the liquidator and purchased the Wickford works, stock, order book and patents. Baguley set up a new subsidiary called McEwan Pratt (1912) Ltd. which resumed production at the Wickford works to fulfil the remaining orders. Leonard Bentall, the McEwan Pratt draughtsman, became the chief draughtsman of Baguley and led the design of future Baguley and McEwan Pratt designs, which shared many common features. Robert McEwan also joined Baguley where he worked until 1921. He then left to form Light Railways Ltd which operated until 1929, and was an agent for Baguley locomotives.

First World War 

During the First World War, the War Department (WD) was responsible for transport services to support the British troops. They made extensive use of railways to supply the trenches and used  gauge railways to move munitions, food and other goods from supply depots to the front lines. In 1915, the WD put out a tender for the supply of lightweight "rail tractors" to operate these lines. Leonard Benhall designed a 10hp  locomotive based on a 1914 design supplied to a mine in Japan. The new locomotive was water-cooled and had a large tank to carry the water. More than 50 locomotives of this new design were supplied to military railways during the conflict, though they were only a limited success, being too light for many duties. These locomotives were sold under the Baguley name.

1920s 
Baguley continued to use the McEwan Pratt name into the 1920s.

Production 
No locomotives built by McEwan Pratt at their Wickford works are known to have survived, though several early Baguley locomotives built to McEwan Pratt designs do. The following classes were produced at Wickford:

References 

Locomotive manufacturers of the United Kingdom
Engineering companies of the United Kingdom
Companies established in 1905
Companies disestablished in 1912